California Speed is a racing video game developed and published by Atari Games and Midway Games. The game was first released in arcades for Atari/Midway Seattle Arcade System hardware in 1998 and was ported to the Nintendo 64 in 1999 by Midway Games. The Nintendo 64 version of the game contains support for the Controller Pak and the Rumble Pak also the full support for multiplayer mode.

Gameplay
California Speed is set on many cities on the outskirts and streets across the state of California. Players compete against different racers on the track.  Traffic can appear on races which players must avoid. Stunts such as jumps appear on many tracks in the game to allow an extra feature to appease players. Players can race with several different cars, including a golf cart, with the automatic or manual transmissions, and can alter the colors.

Mojave Desert Billboard 
In April of 2012, a post was made to the r/creepygaming subreddit about a mysterious billboard discovered in the "Mojave Desert" level of the game. The billboard bore black text on a white background with the following message: 

The comments on the reddit thread expressed surprise at the inclusion of the creepy message within an otherwise innocuous piece of media.
The reason for the billboard message's inclusion was not known until February of 2016, when the website Popoptic published an article in which Morgan Godat, a textural artist for the game, explained that the game had been created under a serious time crunch. 

"Crunch" time and a lack of quality control is the likely cause of the billboard making it into the final game.

Similar games from Atari/Midway
Cruis'n USA (October 1994)
Cruis'n World (November 1996)

Reception

Next Generation reviewed the arcade version of the game, rating it three stars out of five, and stated that "in the end, California Speed is aimed directly at the middle of the gaming audience, and it plays that way too."

Notes

References

External links

1998 video games
Arcade video games
Atari arcade games
Atari games
Midway video games
Nintendo 64 games
Racing video games set in the United States
Multiplayer and single-player video games
Video games developed in the United States
Video games scored by Chris Granner